Aubessagne is a commune in the department of Hautes-Alpes, southeastern France. The municipality was established on 1 January 2018 by merger of the former communes of Chauffayer (the seat), Saint-Eusèbe-en-Champsaur and Les Costes.

See also 
Communes of the Hautes-Alpes department

References 

Communes of Hautes-Alpes

Communes nouvelles of Hautes-Alpes
Populated places established in 2018
2018 establishments in France